Tuomas Ilari Kettunen (born 9 January 1988) is a Finnish politician currently serving in the Parliament of Finland for the Centre Party at the Oulu constituency.

References

1988 births
Living people
Finnish Lutherans
Centre Party (Finland) politicians
Members of the Parliament of Finland (2019–23)